"Believe What I Say" is a song by American rapper Kanye West from his tenth studio album, Donda (2021). The song features additional vocals from Buju Banton, Dem Jointz and Stalone; and samples "Doo Wop (That Thing)" by Lauryn Hill. It was serviced to US rhythmic contemporary radio as the album's third single on November 30, 2021 (second promoted to radio formats).

The song peaked at number 28 on the Billboard Hot 100, and also reached the top 40 in Australia and Canada.

Background
On September 15, 2020, West posted a series of tweets about his relationship with Universal Music Group. In the tweets, the rapper expressed desire to buy back his master recordings. He went on to leak his full recording contract documents between himself and Universal. He also stated that he is "not putting no more music out until I'm done with my contract with Sony and Universal.". The next day, on September 16, West flew out to Jamaica and recorded music with Buju Banton and Saint Jhn, the former of which features on the track. On September 26, West shared a snippet of "Believe What I Say" on his Twitter account. The track samples Lauryn Hill's 1998 song "Doo Wop (That Thing)". 

The track was officially previewed on August 26, 2021 at the Donda listening event at Soldier Field. On September 9, composer Antman Wonder, who was initially left off the credits, posted the original version of the track; claiming that West had not properly credited his, as well as several other artists' contributions to Donda. The credits were later updated to include his contribution.

Credits
 Kanye West – production, vocals, songwriting
 Dem Jointz – production, additional vocals, record engineering, songwriting
 Buju Banton – additional vocals, songwriting
 BoogzDaBeast – co-production, songwriting
 FnZ – co-production, songwriting
 Ojivolta – co-production, songwriting
 Antman Wonder – additional production
 Stalone – additional vocals, songwriting
 Irko – mix engineering, master engineering
 Devon Wilson – record engineering
 Mikalai Skrobat – record engineering
 Josh Berg – record engineering
 Preston Reid – record engineering
 Louis Bell – vocal editing
 Patrick Hundley – vocal editing

Charts

Weekly charts

Year-end charts

Certifications

References

2021 songs
2021 singles
Kanye West songs
Song recordings produced by Kanye West
Songs written by Cyhi the Prynce
Songs written by Kanye West
Hip house songs
American contemporary R&B songs
American soul songs